The Draug class was the first multi-vessel class of destroyers built for the Royal Norwegian Navy  in the early 20th century and the first destroyers constructed for the Royal Norwegian Navy since , which was commissioned on 17 May 1896. All three were built at the naval shipyard at Horten. The Draug class saw service until the 1940s. In 1940, Garm was sunk while the other two remained in service until sold and broken up for scrap.

Characteristics
The Draug class was patterned on the British , only somewhat larger and more heavily armed. The destroyers had a complement of 76 officers and ratings.

They carried six  quick-firing guns, as well as three trainable  torpedo tubes.

Ships in class

Service history
As the single Valkyrjen was not enough to fulfil the need for destroyers, the Draug class was ordered and built in the years 1908–1913. Draug was the lead ship, launched in 1908, followed by Troll| in 1909 and Garm in 1913. The class, and lead ship, was named after the Draugr – a sinister, malevolent being of Nordic origin and often connected with mariners and the sea.

All three ships were kept in commission until the Second World War, although they were mothballed years before 1939. As war became imminent, the three ships were returned to active service, Troll and Garm on 28 August, Draug on 5 September 1939. As all three ships were in poor condition, it took much time and work before they could be declared operational. After mobilisation, the Draug-class vessels were considered fit only for escort and guard service. They served with the 1st Destroyer Division based at Bergen.

On 8 April 1940, as the German invasion of Norway was imminent, the three Draug-class ships were posted to the 2nd Naval District in south- and mid-western Norway. Draug was based at Haugesund, Garm at Bergen and Troll at Måløy. Draug escaped to the United Kingdom on 9 April 1940 after an action against German transports. Garm was sunk by German bombers at the village of Bjordal in the Sognefjord on 26 April 1940. Troll, which had been ordered to Shetland, was abandoned by her crew at Florø was captured at anchor by the advancing German forces on 18 May 1940. Troll was used as a condensor vessel and heating barge in the shipyard at Laksevaag.

Draug served as an escort vessel on the east coast of Britain until she was scrapped in 1944. Troll was returned to Norway by the Germans following the end of the Second World War. The ship was sold in 1947 and broken up for scrap.

Citations

Bibliography

Further reading

External links
 Naval History via Flix: KNM Draug, retrieved 29 January 2006
 Ships of the Norwegian navy, retrieved 29 January 2006

Destroyer classes